Pestil, also known as bastık, is dried fruit pulp, best exemplified in the English term "fruit leather." Fruit leather is made from mechanically pulverizing fruit, then spreading it out to dry into a tough, yet flexible and edible material which can be kept preserved for several months in an airtight container.

A plum-based dessert from Bulgaria is also called pestil. It's prepared by boiling plums with sugar and water and cooling the mixture in a solid layer. Bulgarian pestil is sometimes thicker than its Turkish counterpart and might be cut in small pieces instead of rolled up. 

Pestil might be made with different types of fruit beside plums. Apples, apricots, pears, peaches and melons are popular choices.

Etymology 

According to Turkish etymological dictionary Nişanyan Sözlük, Turkish pestil and Italian  are cognates and pastillo might have derived from Italian . The dictionary asserts that the relationship between pestil and French pastille is ambiguous. The oldest written record of the Turkish word is dated back to 1501 dictionary Câmiü'l-Fürs.

According to Robert Dankoff, the term bastık, used in much of Anatolia including Bursa, Kayseri, and Van, derives from Armenian pasteł ("" / "fruit leather") which in turn derives from Ancient Greek  ("pastille").

See also
 Churchkhela
 Kaysefe
 Orcik candy
 Pastila
 Fruit Roll-Ups
 Tklapi

References

External links

Turkish desserts
Turkish words and phrases
Armenian desserts
Greek desserts
Bulgarian desserts
Fruit dishes